The Indian Cricket League 20-20 Indian Championship 2007/08 was the first tournament in the debut season of the ICL. The season commenced on 30 November 2007 and the final match was held on 16 December 2007. The league consisted of six teams and each team played each other once prior to classification matches.

2007 season
The inaugural season for the Indian Cricket League was scheduled to begin in October 2007 but later shifted to start from 30 November with six club teams. The Chennai Superstars emerged as the inaugural ICL champions, beating the Chandigarh Lions by 12 runs in the final. Superstars bowler Shabbir Ahmed was declared Man of the Match for claiming four wickets, including a hat-trick while Superstars batsman Ian Harvey was declared Player of the Tournament for scoring 266 runs in 7 matches and taking 9 wickets.

Fixtures and results

Standings

 Semi-finals 
 5th Place Play-off

Knock-out

 All Games played at  'Home Ground'  - Tau Devi Lal Cricket Stadium, Panchkula
  Man of the Series: Ian Harvey

References

External links 
 ICL 20-20 Indian Championship, 2007–08 at ESPNcricinfo

Indian Cricket League seasons
2008 in Indian cricket